For Each and Every One (KuK), previously known as Law and Order (LuK), is a right-wing populist political party in Latvia. It is positioned on the right-wing on the political spectrum and it is staunchly socially conservative and Eurosceptic. It was founded in January 2021 and is led by Saeima deputy Aldis Gobzems.

Founding 
Since being expelled from Who Owns the State? in February 2019, Aldis Gobzems had hinted at starting a new party. 
A preliminary kick-off event for the party was held in Riga on October 10, 2020, with a promise to found the party by November 22 the same year. Due to a national state of emergency caused by the COVID-19 pandemic and introduced on 9 November, that – among other things – put a temporary ban on gathering the 200 people needed to legally register a political party, the party founding and registration was postponed. In a December 28, 2020 interview with Latvijas Avīze, Gobzems said that he would found the party on January 8, 2021.

The party was eventually founded via videolink on 8 January 2021. Among the over 500 co-founders attending the conference call were the four Saeima deputies Aldis Gobzems, Karina Sprūde, Ļubova Švecova, and Jūlija Stepaņenko. Gobzems and Sprūde were elected in the 2018 elections on the list of Who Owns the State? (now called For a Humane Latvia), while Švecova and Stepaņenko were elected on the Harmony list. Aldis Gobzems and Jūlija Stepaņenko were elected co-chairmen of the party.

On 29 January 2021, the Latvian Register of Enterprises postponed their decision on whether to legally register the party or not, due to issues with insufficient information in the application documents. The party was given until 29 April to fix the issues. On 26 February, the Register of Enterprises officially registered the party.

Party co-chair Jūlija Stepaņenko and board member Ļubova Švecova, both members of parliament, left the party on 30 June 2021, citing Gobzems' style of communication. He had in weeks leading up to the breakaway been criticised for encouraging people not vaccinated against COVID-19 to wear a yellow star, as he claims the government's alleged discrimination against non-vaccinated people is comparable to that of the Jews in Nazi Germany.

Election results

Legislative elections

Notes

References

External links 
 Official website (in Latvian)

Political parties established in 2021
Political parties in Latvia
Right-wing populist parties
Eurosceptic parties in Latvia
Conservative parties in Latvia
Nationalist parties in Latvia